Soriba Kouyaté (1963–2010) was a Senegalese kora player. He was born in Dakar, the son of kora player Mamadou Kouyaté.

He played with musicians like Youssou N'Dour, Salif Keita, Peter Gabriel, Dizzy Gillespie, Harry Belafonte, Diana Ross, Ray Lema and the Kora Jazz Trio.

Kouyaté died 46 years old after a heart attack.

Discography 
 Djigui (1995)
 Kanakassi (1999)
 Bamana (2001)
 Spirits Of Rhythm (2002), guest
 Live in Montreux (2003), ACT

References

Senegalese Kora players
1963 births
People from Dakar
2010 deaths
ACT Music artists